The Women's downhill competition of the Innsbruck 1976 Olympics was held at Axamer Lizum on Sunday, 8 February.

The defending world champion was Annemarie Moser-Pröll of Austria, who was also the defending World Cup downhill champion, but spent this year away from racing to care for her ailing father; Switzerland's Bernadette Zurbriggen led the current season. Defending Olympic champion Marie-Theres Nadig was entered in the race but did not start.

Rosi Mittermaier won the gold medal, Brigitte Totschnig of Austria took the silver, and Cindy Nelson of the United States was the bronze medalist. Mittermaier also won the slalom and was the runner-up in the giant slalom.

Results
Sunday, February 8, 1976

References 

Women's downhill
Alp
Oly
Women's downhill